Higashi-osaka held a mayoral election on July 2, 2006. The election was won by JCP candidate Nagao Junzo. Both candidates did run as independents but were supported by different political fractions.

External links
 ザ･選挙　-選挙情報-

Higashiōsaka
Local elections in Japan
2006 elections in Japan
2006 in Japan
2006 Higa
July 2006 events in Japan